The Petroleum Products Pricing Regulatory Agency (PPPRA) is an agency of the government of Nigeria established in 2003 to, among other responsibilities, monitor and regulate the supply and distribution, and determine the prices of petroleum products in Nigeria. Its headquarters is located in Abuja, Nigeria.

The current Chairman of the Agency is Atuonwo A. Obinna (2021 - date), and the Executive Secretary is Abdulkadir Saidu Umar (2018 - date). Previous Chief Executives are Dr. Oluwole Oluleye (2003 - 2009), Mr. Abiodun Ibikunle (2009 - 2011), Engr. Goody Chike Egbuji (2011 - 2011), Dr. Reginald Stanley (2011 - 2014), Mr. Farouk Ahmed (2014 - 2016) and Mrs. Sotonye E. Iyoyo  (2016 - 2018)

The PPPRA has a 26-member Board which inter alia includes the Central Bank of Nigeria (CBN), Federal Ministry of Finance (FMF), Nigeria Employers Consultative Association (NECA), Nigeria Labour Congress (NLC), Trade Union Congress (TUC), Petroleum and Natural Gas Senior Staff Association of Nigeria (PENGASSAN), National Union of Petroleum and National Gas Workers (NUPENG), National Association of Road Transport Owners (NARTO), National Union of Road Transport Workers (NURTW), Nigerian Guild of Editors, National Association of Chambers of Commerce, Industry, Mines and Agriculture (NACCIMA), MOMAN, DAPPMA, Independent Petroleum Marketers Association of Nigeria (IPMAN), amongst others.

References

External links

 Petroleum Products Pricing Regulatory Agency. www.pppra.gov.ng
 Workers shut down PPPRA as another chief executive emerges - Vanguard Newspaper.

Petroleum in Nigeria
Government of Nigeria
2003 establishments in Nigeria
Government agencies established in 2003
Non-renewable resource companies established in 2003
Energy regulatory authorities
Regulation in Nigeria